Just not Married is a 2016 Nigerian heist drama film starring Stan Nze, Rotimi Salami, Roland Obutu, Judith Audu, and Brutus Richards. The film was written by Lani Aisida and directed by Uduak-Obong Patrick. The film was shot within Lagos State.

Plot
Joyce Nyamma (Perpetua Adefemi), the matriarch of the Nyamma family is terminally ill and struggling financially. Unlike Joyce, Duke Nyamma (Stan Nze), her son, is excited to welcome home his brother, Victor Nyamma (Roland Obutu) who just got out of prison.  Joyce still blames Victor, her first son, for abandoning the family as the man of the house when he went to jail and is fearful that he will be a negative influence on Duke and she warns him to stay away from her son Duke.

Duke realises that there will never be enough money to buy the drugs his mum needs and pay for his tuition fees. He decides to become a car thief and comes up with a gimmick to steal cars. He enlists the help of his friend from the hood, Lati Asunmo (Rotimi Salami), and Lati's ex-girlfriend Keji Anuola, (Judith Audu) completes the team. The idea is that they would steal cars under the guise of being a newly wedded couple returning from their wedding ceremony in a decorated car.

Their very first operation is very successful. Lati who is a mechanic breaks into the vehicles and hot-wires them. They decorate the car and change into their costumes.  Keji acts as the Bride, while Duke is the Groom and Lati is the Driver.

Victor is totally unaware of his brother's new found life and is struggling to find a job and trying to win back his mother's love which is totally futile. Keji and Victor begin a relationship that is kept quiet.

As the months go by and Duke is able to buy drugs for his mum and he is able to stay in school though his grades are affected. But the new found life gets the better of him and he eventually drops out of school.

The team realise that they are being cheated by their buyer Ekun (Gregory Ojefua) who pays a flat amount for every car stolen. They want more and he isn't willing to pay more. Lati tell the team that he heard of a new buyer who would be willing to pay more. They decide to go see him.  They meet with YJ (Brutus Richard), an ex-convict and former cellmate of Victor. They strike a deal and begin stealing cars for YJ.

Victor finally gets a job as a delivery boy. He still tries to make peace with his mother but she is unforgiving. Consistently working with Keji, Duke is also beginning to feel something for her. Duke asks Lati if he should proceed, Lati encourages him to go on.

On one of their deliveries to YJ, Duke meets his brother at YJ's place, and Duke is introduced as one of his “boys”. Victor tries to warn Duke to leave the life of crime he's begun to lead but Duke is very strong-headed and determined to see it through. His words “I can’t be poor”.

Duke and Keji finally go out on a date.  Duke wants out and he tells Keji he wants to stop stealing cars and start something legitimate. But she's not ready to give it up yet. According to her, they all just got started. The  new guy pays way better and life is really good. Just when he is about to tell Keji how he feels about her,  Lati comes in with news that his mum has passed on. This brings Duke and Victor's world tumbling down. He goes underground for a while. Duke decides to go back into robbery but this time with an exit strategy. He wants to go to Malaysia to continue his education.

They go on a spree and exceed their deliverable. YJ is happy, but a wrong move on Duke's part causes YJ to send his men to find out their Mode of Operation.

During one of their operations, Duke sees ZEB (L.A.S.E) one of YJ's thugs following them. He confronts YJ about this and ends up getting a serious beating. Duke decides that it is time to cut ties with YJ. On their way to tell Keji, they meet Victor.

They decide to call it quits but Lati has been mismanaging his funds and begs them to do one last run.

YJ who has been spying on Duke the whole time tries stealing the money from Duke but Victor comes looking for his brother. YJ tells him that his brother has been nabbed by the police. They get into a fight and Victor ends up killing YJ.

The team go on their last trip but end up in a car chase with the police as YJ had tipped the police off. They try to run off on foot. Lati gets caught. An ambush has been laid for Keji at her home. Duke gets to the hotel where he has been staying only to find his brother being carted away by the police. Again his brother has taken the fall for Duke.

Duke leaves town.

Cast

Stan Nze as Duke
Rotimi Salami as Lati
Obutu Roland as Victor
Judith Audu as Keji
Perpetua Adefemi as Joyce
Brutus Richard as YJ
Ijeoma Grace Agu as Hauwa
Gregory Ojefua as Ekun
Sambasa Nzeribe as Bako
Adedayo Davies as Akanji
L.A.S.E as Zeb
Tomiwa Kukoyi as Musa
Eric Nwanso as Sule
Adeniyi Johnson as Philip
Bucci Franklin as Papi
Seun Afolabi as Rasaki
Jordan Igbinoba as Chuka
Oriyomi ‘16’ Oniru as Gowon
Nneka Pattrick as Ufuoma
Morten Foght as John Stone
Chris Biyibi as Uncle Patrick
Vanessa Kanu as Sharon
Ubong David as Receptionist
Omoniyi Sunday as Prison Warden
Attoh Joseph as Policeman
Iboro Ntiokiet as Policeman
Damilola Richards as Policeman
Oluwadamilare Adegeye as Policeman
Larry Homs Ahmed as Policeman
Emem Ekpenyong-Oniru as Salon Customer
Gladys Tivkaa as Salon Customer
Adekunle Ademola as Tricycle Driver
Mudasiru Danjuma as Tricycle Driver

Production and release
Principal Photography began on the 23 August 2015, the trailer was released online on the 4 February 2016. The film was screened at the Lagos Yacht Club on the 13 April 2016 and premiered at the Genesis Deluxe Cinema, Lekki on 6 May 2016. The film was released across Nigeria on 13 May 2016. It was distributed by Metro Classic Pictures in Nigeria, and by Cellarmade Nigeria in foreign markets.

The film was selected to be screened at the 2016 Toronto International Film Festival. The Film's official release poster, which was designed by Femi Morakinyo, has been put up for sale by the Art Nigeria website.

Critical reception
Movie review website www.cinemaguide.com.ng giving it a rating of 7/10, commenting: "Just Not Married is one movie that proves popularity doesn't make a movie superb. We have our eyes set on Judith Audu".

Awards and accolades
Just Not Married was nominated at the 2016 City People Entertainment Awards for Best Movie Producer of the Year (English).

Winner, Outstanding Actress, Abuja international Film Festival 2016
Winner, Best Nigerian Film, Eko International Film Festival 2016
Nominee, Best Producer, City People Entertainment Awards 2016 
Nominee, Best Producer, ZAFAA Awards 2016
Nominee, Best Lead Actor, ZAFAA Awards 2016
Nominee, Best Cinematographer, ZAFAA Awards 2016
Nominee, Best Lead Actor, Best of Nollywood Awards 2016
Winner, Best Lead Actress, Best of Nollywood Awards 2016
Nominee, Best Supporting Actor, Best of Nollywood Awards 2016
Winner, Most Promising Actor, Best of Nollywood Awards 2016
Nominee, Best Comedy, Best of Nollywood Awards 2016
Nominee, Best Screenplay, Best of Nollywood Awards 2016
Nominee, Best Editing, Best of Nollywood Awards 2016
Nominee, Best Cinematography, Best of Nollywood Awards 2016
Nominee, Best Director, Best of Nollywood Awards 2016
Winner, Best Supporting Actor, Africa Magic Viewers Choice Awards (2017)
Winner, Nollywood Viewers Choice Awards, MAYA Awards (2017)
TIFF. Toronto International Film Festival 2016, Official Selection
Official Selection, STARS ON THE HORIZON, 7th Jagran Film Festival 2016
Official Selection, The Australian Festival of African Film 2016
Abuja International Film Festival 2016, Official Selection
Official Selection, Africa International Film Festival 2016
Official Selection, Eko International Film Festival 2016
Official Selection, Nile Diaspora International Film Festival 2016
Official Selection, Pan African Film Festival, LA 2017
Official Selection, The African Film Festival, Dallas, 2017

References

External links
 
 Just Not Married official info at Rushlake Media

2010s heist films
Films shot in Lagos
English-language Nigerian films
2010s English-language films